Hen Hop is a 1942 drawn-on-film animation short created by Norman McLaren for the National Film Board of Canada. In it, a hen gradually breaks apart into an abstract movement of lines as it dances to a barn dance. 

One of a number of drawn-on-film animated works created by McLaren, Hen Hop was animated by inking and scraping film stock, with colour added optically afterwards.

To make Hen Hop, McLaren spent days in a chicken coop to capture what he called "the spirit of henliness".

Reception
Hen Hop received a Special Award at the 1949 World Film Festival in Brussels.

Upon viewing it, Pablo Picasso was reported to have exclaimed "at last something new". 

Dutch animator Gerrit van Dijk, reproduces part of the film as well as quotes from McLaren about making Hen Hop his 1997 work, I Move, So I Am.

References

External links
 
 

1942 films
1942 short films
1942 animated films
1940s Canadian films
1940s animated short films
Drawn-on-film animated films
Canadian animated short films
Animated musical films
Visual music
Abstract animation
National Film Board of Canada animated short films
Animated films about chickens
Films set in Canada
Films set on farms
Films set in 1942
Animated films without speech
Films directed by Norman McLaren